Richard Maurice "Mike" Elliott (November 3, 1887 - May 6, 1969) was an American psychologist who served as the departmental chair of the University of Minnesota Psychology Department from 1919 until 1951.

Biography
Elliott was born in Lowell, Massachusetts. He received his Bachelor's degree from Dartmouth College and in 1910 went on to graduate school at Harvard University where he was advised by Hugo Münsterberg and influenced by Robert Yerkes. During World War I, Elliott conducted mental testing under the command of Donald G. Paterson. Elliott arrived to chair the new University of Minnesota Psychology Department in 1919.

Elliott was credited with building the Minnesota psychology department into a world-class institution, recruiting eminent psychologists including Karl Lashley, B. F. Skinner, Starke R. Hathaway, Paul Meehl, and Donald G. Paterson during his 32-year term as chair of the department.

References

1887 births
1969 deaths
20th-century American psychologists
Harvard University alumni
University of Minnesota faculty
Dartmouth College alumni